Bergenia purpurascens, the purple bergenia, is a species of flowering plant in the family Saxifragaceae. It is a perennial herb and is native to Nepal, the eastern Himalayas, Assam, Tibet, south-central China, and Myanmar. The species, its putative variety Bergenia purpurascens var. delavayi, and its cultivar 'Irish Crimson' have all gained the Royal Horticultural Society's Award of Garden Merit. A useful feature in the garden is the visual interest that its foliage provides by turning a deep beet red during the winter. The Latin specific epithet purpurascens is in reference to the foliage that is purple in color.

References

purpurascens
Flora of South-Central China
Flora of Tibet
Flora of Assam (region)
Flora of East Himalaya
Flora of Nepal
Flora of Myanmar
Garden plants of Asia
Plants described in 1868